TRTÉ is an Irish children's television program that airs on public service broadcaster RTÉ2.  Its target demographic is people between 7 and 15 years of age. On some networks — Virgin Media Ireland, eir Vision and Vodafone TV—TRTÉ is a separate channel in the children's section that simulcasts TRTÉ on RTÉ2.

In late 2016, significant cutbacks drove TRTÉ to downsize and broadcast fewer programmes such as News2day and other content for the 7 to 15-year-old age group. Its sister block for teenagers was dropped in 2016, while TRTÉ earlier at 4:30, and is now branded as RTÉ2.

Since 2019, the brand has lost viewership. Over the last few years, TRTÉ was rebranded RTÉ2, with only TRTÉ idents in use at the beginning of programmes. RTÉ2 programme promos are now used for TRTÉ programming.

Imported programming 

TRTÉ aired mostly children's shows from original networks such as iCarly, Aaron Stone, Catscratch, Dorg Van Dango, Sabrina, The Teenage Witch, Dani's House, Summerhill, The Bagel and Becky Show, Ollie's Pack, Scooby-Doo! Mystery Incorporated, Pucca, Yin Yang Yo!, The Strange Chores, and Freaktown.

Films 
TRTÉ shows family films that are rated G, PG, and 12A during the holidays.

Original series

Past programming

Reality TV 
 Mission Beach
 Football's Next Star
 Super Cr3w

Entertainment 
 OMG! Jedward's Dream Factory

Drama/Comedy 
 Roy

TV specials 
Over holiday periods, along with movies, TRTÉ broadcast a selection of TV specials.

Specials that have aired are:
 A Grand Day Out
 The Wrong Trousers
 A Close Shave (most common Wallace & Gromit short)
 Wallace & Gromit in A Matter of Loaf and Death
 Monsters vs. Aliens: Mutant Pumpkins from Outer Space
 Secrets of the Furious Five
 Shrek The Halls
 Merry Madagascar
 Banjo the Woodpile Cat (last aired on 1 August 2009)
 Scruff: A Christmas Tale
 Rikki-Tikki-Tavi
 Duck Dodgers and the Return of the 24½th Century
 Garfield: His 9 Lives

See also
 Cúla 4
 RTÉ Junior
 RTÉjr
 The Den
 RTÉ Young People's Programming

References

External links
 Official website

2010 Irish television series debuts
Children's television networks
Commercial-free television networks
European Broadcasting Union members
Irish television shows featuring puppetry
Publicly funded broadcasters
RTÉ original programming
RTÉ television channels
State-sponsored bodies of the Republic of Ireland
Television networks in Ireland